Major contributors to space debris include the explosion of upper stages and satellite collisions.

Overview
There were 190 known satellite breakups between 1961 and 2006. 
By 2015, the total had grown to 250 on-orbit fragmentation events.

 there were an estimated 500,000 pieces of debris in orbit, with 300,000 pieces below 2000 km (LEO).  Of the total, about 20,000 are tracked. Also, about sixteen old Soviet nuclear space reactors are known to have released an estimated 100,000 NaK liquid metal coolant droplets 800–900 km up, which range in size from 1 – 6 cm.

The greatest risk to space missions is from untracked debris between 1 and 10 cm in size. Large pieces can be tracked and avoided, and impact from smaller pieces are usually survivable.

Top debris creation events

Recent events

References

Space debris